The King of the Kingdom of Bahrain is the monarch and head of state of Bahrain. The House of Khalifa has been the ruling family since 1783. Between 1783 and 1971, the Bahraini monarch held the title of hakim, and, from 1971 until 2002, the title of emir. On 14 February 2002, the emir of Bahrain, Hamad bin Isa Al Khalifa, declared Bahrain a kingdom and proclaimed himself the first king. The king enjoys wide ranging powers, which include appointing the prime minister and the cabinet, holding supreme command over the Defence Force, chairing the Higher Judicial Council, appointing the parliament's upper house and dissolving its elected lower house.

List of rulers

Hakims of Bahrain (1783–1971)

The Arabic title of the Hakim, as transliterated, was Hakim al-Bahrayn. The Hakim also held the honorific title of sheikh.

Emirs of Bahrain (1971–2002)

The Arabic title of the Emir, as transliterated, was Amir dawlat al-Bahrayn. The Emir also held the honorific title of sheikh.

King of Bahrain (2002–present)
The Arabic title of the King, as transliterated, is Malik al-Bahrayn. The King also holds the honorific title of sheikh.

See also
House of Khalifa
Succession to the Bahraini throne
Prime Minister of Bahrain

References

History of Bahrain
Bahrain
 
Bahrain
1783 establishments in Asia